The Naval Coastal Warfare community is a component of the United States Navy, part of Naval Expeditionary Combat Command. The Maritime Expeditionary Security Force (MESF), formerly known as the Mobile Security Forces (MSF), has the primary mission of force protection conducted through fleet support with operations around the world. Anti-Terrorism and Force Protection missions include harbor and homeland defense, coastal surveillance, and special missions.

History
It is undergoing a major overhaul and transitioning to the Maritime Expeditionary Security Force (MESF), units affected range from Mobile Inshore Undersea Warfare Unit's to Inshore Boat Units.

Locations
Coastal Riverine Force (CRF) Squadrons deploy worldwide to detect, deter, and defend an area, unit, or High Value Asset. Recent locations include the United States, Korea, Saudi Arabia, Kuwait, Bahrain, Iraq, Afghanistan, United Arab Emirates, Djibouti and Egypt.

Coastal Riverine Groups (CRG) One and Two provide centralized planning, control, training, coordination, equipping, and integration of coastal warfare assets trained to operate in high density, multi-threat environments. Units conduct force protection of strategic shipping and naval vessels operating in the inshore and coastal assets, anchorages and harbors, from bare beach to sophisticated port facilities."  Members of this community are highly encouraged to earn their Enlisted Expeditionary Warfare Specialist Designation.

See also
 Mobile Inshore Undersea Warfare Unit
 Expeditionary war

References

External links
 Naval Coastal Warfare Squadron FIVE

Military units and formations of the United States Navy
Riverine warfare